Mi Historia Musical may refer to:

Mi Historia Musical (Jaci Velasquez album), 2004
Mi Historia Musical (Juan Gabriel album), 2016
Mi Historia Musical, a 2017 album by Aventura
Mi Historia Musical, a 2008 album by Daniel Santos
Mi Historia Musical, a 2004 album by Duelo
Mi Historia Musical, a 2005 album by Emmanuel
Mi Historia Musical, a 2008 album by Felipe Pirela
Mi Historia Musical, a 1986 album by Frankie Ruiz
Mi Historia Musical, a 2004 album by Jerry Rivera
Mi Historia Musical, a 2016 album by Joan Sebastian
Mi Historia Musical, a 2016 album by José José
Mi Historia Musical, a 2005 album by Leonardo Paniagua
Mi Historia Musical, a 2016 album by Redimi2
Mi Historia Musical, a 2005 album by Rey Ruiz
Mi Historia Musical, a 1992 album by  Rudy La Scala
Mi Historia Musical, a 2017 album by  Silvestre Dangond
Mi Historia Musical 20 Corridos, a 2010 album by Beto Quintanilla
Mi Historia Musical – The Classic Years, a 2017 album by Celia Cruz

See also
 Historia Musical de Alfredo Gutiérrez, a 2002 album by Alfredo Gutiérrez